Podcasts have been increasingly adapted into other forms of media such as television shows, films, and books.

Below is a list of podcasts that have been adapted into other forms of media or inspired the development of them.

List

References 

 
Adaptations